Clayton E. Cramer is an American historian, author, gun enthusiast, and software engineer. He played an important early role in documenting errors in the book Arming America by Michael A. Bellesiles, a book that was later proven to be based on fraudulent research. His work was cited by the United States District Court for the Northern District of Texas in United States v. Emerson, 46 F.Supp.2d 598 (N.D.Tex. 1999). His research also informed the Supreme Court decision in the Second Amendment cases District of Columbia v. Heller and McDonald v. Chicago. He holds an MA in history from Sonoma State University. He currently resides in Horseshoe Bend, Idaho, near Boise.

Arming America controversy

In 1996, while working on his master's thesis, Cramer read a paper by Bellesiles on early gun laws, published in the Journal of American History.  This paper formed a basis for Bellesiles' later book, Arming America.  Cramer's thesis "examined the development of concealed weapon laws in the early Republic", and he was struck by how Bellesiles' paper contradicted his own knowledge of gun availability in early America. However, at the time, Cramer attributed the contradiction to Bellesiles having picked differing sources from those that Cramer himself knew well.

Cramer was later sent an early review copy of Arming America: The Origins of a National Gun Culture.  Upon reading it, Cramer immediately noted significant discrepancies with what he knew of American history, particularly at the time of the American Revolution.  He began checking facts and discovered that many of Bellesiles' citations and quotes did not match the historical record. "I sat down with a list of bizarre, amazing claims that Bellesiles had made, and started chasing down the citations at Sonoma State University’s library. I found quotations out of context that completely reversed the author’s original intent. I found dates changed. I found the text of statutes changed — and the changes completely reversed the meaning of the law. It took me twelve hours of hunting before I found a citation that was completely correct."

Cramer's research encountered resistance from journal editors and other historians, but he continued alleging fraud against Bellesiles' scholarship.  Other historians, including James Lindgren of Northwestern University, supported Cramer's claims, and Emory University conducted an investigation which was strongly critical of Bellesiles' ethical standards. Bellesiles resigned his position at Emory on the day the report was released. On December 13, 2002, Bellesiles' Bancroft Prize was revoked by the Columbia University Board of Trustees.

Other activities
Cramer has written a regular column on gun owners' rights and related issues for Shotgun News. Clayton also manages an online blog titled ‘Civilian Gun Self-Defense Blog’ which records civilian use of firearms in self-defense through citing news articles across the nation.  He also manages a personal website and personal blog which includes links to his books, journal articles, and other publications.  Cramer's scholarly papers can be found on the Social Science Resource Network.

In 2008, Cramer ran for Idaho State Senator from District 22 as a Republican, but was defeated in the primary.

Besides his research and publications on gun owners' rights and American history, Cramer also has a strong personal interest in the treatment of the mentally ill. He is critical of the recent policy of making involuntary commitment of seriously mentally ill persons extremely difficult, and has researched and compiled a book explaining the origins of this policy and its present-day effects.

Cramer is also an avid amateur astronomer. He has developed a system of lockable wheels for heavy telescope mountings, which he dubbed "ScopeRoller". He manufactures ScopeRoller in his home machine shop for sale to other amateur astronomers.

Publications

"On the right side of the bullet: More Americans protect themselves with guns than you think." Washington Times.February 9, 2012.

References

External links

Clayton Cramer's personal website
http://claytonecramer.blogspot.com/

American male writers
Living people
People from Boise County, Idaho
American gun rights activists
Year of birth missing (living people)